The following shows the public housing estates (including Home Ownership Scheme (HOS), Private Sector Participation Scheme (PSPS), Tenants Purchase Scheme (TPS)) in Ngau Tau Kok, Jordan Valley, Kowloon Bay and surrounding neighbourhoods, in Kwun Tong District, Kowloon, Hong Kong.

Overview

Choi Ha Estate 

Choi Ha Estate is a public estate and TPS estate in the hillside of Jordan Valley near Amoy Gardens. It consists of 3 blocks built in 1989. Some of the flats were sold to tenants through Tenants Purchase Scheme Phase 3 in 2000. Its name comes from nearby Choi Ha Road.

Houses 

Choi Ha Estate is in Primary One Admission (POA) School Net 46. Within the school net are multiple aided schools (operated independently but funded with government money); no government primary schools are in this net.

Choi Fook Estate 

Choi Fook Estate, formerly Choi Wan Road Site 3B, is a public estate in Ping Shan next to Choi Ying Estate. Formerly a quarry site, Choi Fook Estate is a part of the housing development near Choi Wan Road and Jordan Valley. It is developed into 2 phases. All blocks in Phrase 1 & 2 occupied in 2010. other 1 further block in Phase 3 will be occupied in 2020.

Choi Hing Court 

Choi Hing Court is a home ownership scheme court located at a hillside near New Clear Water Bay Road in Choi Hing Road, Ping Shan of Kwun Tong District, opposite to Choi Wan Estate in Wong Tai Sin District. Its location is usually described as Choi Hung, Ngau Tau Kok or Kowloon Bay. It comprises 3 blocks with 1,341 flats in total and completed in 2019.

Houses

Choi Tak Estate 

Choi Tak Estate, formerly Choi Wan Road Site 2 and Choi Wan Road Site 3A, is a public estate in Ping Shan next to Choi Ying Estate. Choi Tak Estate is a part of the housing development near Jordan Valley. It is developed into 3 phases. All blocks occupied in 2010.

Choi Ying Estate 

Choi Ying Estate, formerly Choi Wan Road Site 1, is a public estate in Ping Shan next to Choi Ha Estate. Formerly the Ping Shan Quarry site, Choi Ying Estate is a part of the housing development near Choi Wan Road and Jordan Valley. The estate has 5 blocks and a shopping centre, Choi Ying Place, completed in 2008. There is also a footbridge linking Choi Ying Estate with MTR Kowloon Bay station.

Houses 

Choi Ying Estate is in Primary One Admission (POA) School Net 46. Within the school net are multiple aided schools (operated independently but funded with government money); no government primary schools are in this net.

Chun Wah Court 
Chun Wah Court is a HOS court in Ngau Tau Kok, near On Kay Court. Formerly a site of an administration building of the Hong Kong Housing Authority, the court consists of 1 block built in 1990.

House

Kai Tai Court 
Kai Tai Court is a HOS court in Kowloon Bay, next to Kai Yip Estate. It has totally 4 blocks built in 1983.

Houses

Kai Yip Estate 

Kai Yip Estate is a public estate in Kowloon Bay, next to Richland Gardens.

Background 
The site of Kai Yip Estate was the basement of the Royal Air Force, in which the land was obtained from land reclamation of Kowloon Bay. In 1927, the basement started operations at the south of Nga Tsin Wai Tsuen, and the current sites of Richland Gardens and Kwun Tong Bypass. In 1981, the basement was relocated and Kai Yip Estate was built at part of the site. For the estate name, "Kai" means Kai Tak and "Yip" means "prospect" in Chinese.

Houses 

Kai Yip Estate is in Primary One Admission (POA) School Net 46. Within the school net are multiple aided schools (operated independently but funded with government money); no government primary schools are in this net.

Lok Wah Estate / Lok Nga Court 

Lok Wah Estate is a public housing estate located in Dragon Hill, located on Chun Wah Road, northwest of Kwun Tong Town Central. It is divided into Lok Wah South Estate (樂華南邨) and Lok Wah North Estate (樂華北邨), together with 14 blocks of residential buildings.

Lower Ngau Tau Kok Estate 

Lower Ngau Tau Kok (II) Estate ( or ) is a 7-block public estate in Ngau Tau Kok, located opposite to the MTR Kowloon Bay station. It was demolished from 2009 to 2012. The estate, along with the now demolished Lower Ngau Tau Kok (I) Estate, forms the Lower Ngau Tau Kok Estate.

On Kay Court 

On Kay Court (Chinese: 安基苑) is a HOS court in Ngau Tau Kok, near Chun Wah Court. It was developed into 2 phases in 1982 and 1984 respectively, and it consists of 4 blocks of 29–30 storeys.

Houses

Ping Shek Estate 

Ping Shek Estate (Chinese: 坪石邨) is a public estate in Jordan Valley, Ngau Tau Kok. It is situated between the Kowloon entrance of Clear Water Bay Road to Sai Kung and the entrance of Kwun Tong Road to Kwun Tong. Although it is near Choi Hung Estate, it is just out of the boundary of Wong Tai Sin District and belongs to Kwun Tong District.

Richland Gardens 

Richland Gardens is a HOS and Private Sector Participation Scheme in Kowloon Bay, Kowloon, Hong Kong, near Kai Yip Estate. It was jointly developed by Hong Kong Housing Authority and Shui On. It consists of 22 residential blocks and a shopping centre completed in 1985.

Upper Ngau Tau Kok Estate 

Upper Ngau Tau Kok Estate is a public estate in Ngau Tau Kok, next to Kwun Tong Garden Estate and between MTR Ngau Tau Kok station and Kowloon Bay station. After redevelopment, the estate has 9 blocks developed into 3 phases.

Kwun Tong Garden Estate and Lotus Tower 

Kwun Tong Garden Estate, or Garden Estate, is a public estate in Ngau Tau Kok Road, Ngau Tau Kok, developed by the Hong Kong Housing Society, near MTR Ngau Tau Kok station. It is the first public housing estate in Kwun Tong District. It comprises 5 blocks built in 1965 and 1967 respectively.

Lotus Tower is a public housing estate near Kwun Tong Garden Estate, which was redeveloped from old Kwun Tong Garden Estate blocks.

References 

Ngau Tau Kok
Kowloon Bay
Kwun Tong District
 
 
 
 
Proposed infrastructure in Hong Kong